Alstonia annamensis is a species of plant in the family Apocynaceae. It is endemic to Vietnam.

References

annamensis
Endemic flora of Vietnam
Trees of Vietnam
Endangered plants
Taxonomy articles created by Polbot